Oneta may refer to:

Places
Italy
 Oneta, Lombardy, a comune in the Province of Bergamo

Spain
 Oneta, Spain, a parroquia in the Municipality of Villayón, Asturias

United States
 Oneta, Oklahoma